Wolfgang Engelmann (27 June 1942 – 12 November 2020) was a German politician of the Christian Democratic Union (CDU) and former member of the German Bundestag.

Life 
Engelmann was born on 27 June 1942 in Neuwürschnitz. He joined the CDU in 1962. In the 1990 and 1994 federal elections, Engelmann won the direct mandate in the Annaberg - Stollberg - Zschopau constituency and was thus a member of the German Bundestag for eight years.

References 

1942 births
2020 deaths
Members of the Bundestag for Saxony
Members of the Bundestag 1994–1998
Members of the Bundestag 1990–1994
Members of the Bundestag for the Christian Democratic Union of Germany